Celtic Woman: Home for Christmas is the seventh studio album released by the group Celtic Woman, released on 9 October 2012. It is the third Christmas album released by the group, but only the second available for international purchase.

Home for Christmas features vocalists Chloë Agnew, Lisa Lambe, Méav Ní Mhaolchatha, and fiddler Máiréad Nesbitt. This is the first album to feature Ní Mhaolchatha since her departure from the group in 2007 following the release of the DVD and PBS special accompanying the group's first Christmas album, A Christmas Celebration. It is also the first album not to feature founding member Lisa Kelly, who was at the time on maternity leave (though she appears on the bonus track included with the Japanese edition of the album).

Track listing

PBS special, DVD and Blu-ray release background
The accompanying concert special to the album, entitled Home for Christmas: Live from Dublin, was recorded live at the Helix Theatre in Dublin, Ireland on August 7, 2013 in front of an invited audience. Unlike the album, the line-up of performers was slightly different; former member Chloë Agnew announced prior to the recording of the special that she would be leaving Celtic Woman to focus on solo projects. Since a replacement for Agnew wasn't announced beforehand, Méav Ní Mhaolchatha again returned to take her place with current members Lisa Lambe, Susan McFadden, and Máiréad Nesbitt, for the recording of the special.

The album was re-released on 29 October 2013 in a combo pack containing a DVD copy of the concert, while separate DVD and Blu-ray copies were also issued on the same day. The DVD and Blu-ray releases also include four bonus tracks recorded as part of an acoustic session in the venue prior to the concert with pianist and musical director David Downes.

DVD and Blu-ray track listing

Personnel
Per the liner notes:
Featured performers
 Chloë Agnew - vocals
 Lisa Kelly - vocals (Japanese edition only)
 Lisa Lambe - vocals
 Máiréad Nesbitt - fiddle
 Méav Ní Mhaolchatha - vocals
Musicians
 David Downes - grand piano, whistles, uilleann pipes, percussion, keyboards, orchestrations, choral arrangements, programming
 Anthony Byrne – bagpipes
 Andrew Boland - buann-xa-perqua
The Irish Film Orchestra
 Caitríona Walsh - orchestra contractor
 John Page - conductor
 Therese Timoney - concertmaster
 Martin Johnston - solo cello
 David Agnew - cor anglais
Irish Philharmonic Choir
 Paul McGough - choral contractor
 David Leigh - choral director
Production
 Produced and arranged by David Downes
 Engineered and mixed by Andrew Boland (additional engineering by David Downes)
 Recorded and mixed at STUDIOTWO, Dublin, Ireland
 Orchestra and choir recorded at RTÉ STUDIO ONE, Dublin, Ireland
 Mastered by Ray Staff at Air Lyndhurst, London, United Kingdom
 Bonus tracks mastered by Kevin Bartley at Capitol Mastering, Hollywood, California, United States

Charts
The album was officially certified Platinum around 7 March 2013.

References

Celtic Woman albums
2012 Christmas albums
Christmas albums by Irish artists
Manhattan Records albums
Celtic Christmas albums